The Cervia gas field natural gas field located on the continental shelf of the Adriatic Sea. It was discovered in 1972 and developed by Eni. It began production in 1973 and produces natural gas and condensates. The total proven reserves of the Cervia gas field are around 354 billion cubic feet (10×109m³), and production is slated to be around 46 million cubic feet/day (1.43×105m³) in 2010.

References

Natural gas fields in Italy